Albert Lockley  (20 November 1873 – 26 December 1939) was a Welsh international footballer. He was part of the Wales national football team, playing one match on 19 February 1898 against Ireland.

BBC's Who Do You Think You Are revealed that actor Ralf Little is the great grandson of Albert Lockley.

See also
 List of Wales international footballers (alphabetical)
 List of Wales international footballers born outside Wales

References

1873 births
Welsh footballers
Wales international footballers
Place of birth missing
Year of death missing
Association footballers not categorized by position